Chamond is a surname. Notable people with the surname include:
 Digory Chamond (died 1611), MP Parliament of England
 Emmanuel Chamond (–1611), MP Parliament of England
 John Chamond (fl. 1529–1540), MP Parliament of England
Richard Chamond, MP for Cornwall

See also
 St Chamond (disambiguation)